Grosshöchstetten railway station is a railway station in the municipality of Grosshöchstetten, in the Swiss canton of Bern. It is located on the standard gauge Burgdorf–Thun line of BLS AG.

Services 
 the following services stop at Grosshöchstetten:

References

External links 
 
 

Railway stations in the canton of Bern
BLS railway stations